The Coalition to Reduce Spending is a non-partisan political advocacy group based in Alexandria, Virginia, the United States. The mission of the Coalition to Reduce Spending is to advocate for reduced federal spending and balanced budgets. The coalition believes all the United States federal spending should be open for reduction.

Background
Coalition to Reduce Spending was founded in May 2012.

Leadership
The coalition is led by founder and president Jonathan Bydlak. Corie C. Whalen, Richard Lorenc, Max Raskin, and Chris Brunner serve on the board of directors. Rebekah Johansen serves as the organization's director of outreach.

Advisory board
The Coalition Advisory Board includes investors Peter Schiff and Jim Rogers, political strategist Dave Nalle, Texas businessman Allan Shivers, Jr., and activist Julie Borowski. In February 2013, Herbert London, columnist Deroy Murdock, and Norm Singleton, former legislative director to Congressman Ron Paul, joined the board.

Advocacy

Reject the Debt
The coalition's advocacy centers upon its Reject the Debt candidate pledge and its voter pledge. The candidate pledge states:
I pledge to the citizens of my state and to the American people that, except when related to a congressional authorization of force, I will:
    One, consider all spending open for reduction and vote only for budgets that present a path to balance; and
    Two, vote against any appropriations bill that increases total spending and against the authorization or funding of new programs without offsetting cuts in other programs.

2014 Election Cycle
As of February 2014, 42 candidates nationwide had signed the pledge to Reject the Debt, 22 from 2014 races and 20 from special elections in 2013.

2013 Special Elections
During South Carolina's 1st congressional district special election, 2013, 15 of the 19 candidates in the field signed the coalition's pledge, including 14 of 16 Republicans and 1 of 2 Democrats. After the primary, the pledge became a wedge issue in the runoff election between Curtis Bostic, who had not signed the pledge, and Mark Sanford, who had. Sanford later would reference the pledge in a debate against Democrat Elizabeth Colbert-Busch.
In the primary for the United States Senate special election in Massachusetts, 2013, Republican candidate Dan Winslow signed the coalition's Reject the Debt Pledge.

Since that time, 30 candidates and elected officials have signed the Reject the Debt pledge.

2012 Election Cycle
During the 2012 election cycle, 24 candidates nationwide signed the Reject the Debt pledge.

In the United States Senate election in Texas, 2012 for Kay Bailey Hutchison's vacated seat, both Ted Cruz and David Dewhurst signed the coalition's anti-spending pledge.
 Ted Cruz ultimately won the runoff and the general election. In Georgia's 9th Congressional District, both Doug Collins and Martha Zoller signed Reject the Debt, with Doug Collins going on to win the runoff and the general election.

Other work
The coalition has published various editorials advocating for cutting federal spending. A USA Today opinion piece entitled "Responsible Pentagon cuts could work," suggested that "were the president actually inclined to find a "balanced approach" to deficit reduction, there exist a number of opportunities for substantial savings in the Pentagon's massive $680 billion budget that will not impact the country's ability to defend itself."

Writing in The Hill's Congress Blog in a piece entitled "Missiles to Nowhere," Jonathan Bydlak argued, "like many government programs, MEADS is a classic example of how difficult it can be to cut spending once funding is appropriated and interest groups dig in their heels to defend pet projects."

A piece published in National Review argued that "elected officials can’t keep taxes from rising unless they also curb spending." A December 2012 editorial in RealClearPolitics cited Milton Friedman's claim that "the true burden of taxation is whatever government spends."

The coalition strongly opposed passage of H.R.8, the American Taxpayer Relief Act of 2012, asserting that "The real fiscal cliff — our $16.4 trillion national debt — is looming larger, and this bill only adds to our problem." The organization also opposed suspension of the debt ceiling, with Coalition President Jonathan Bydlak stating, "By delaying a vote on whether and at what cost the federal government should be allowed to borrow more money, House members chose to deny accountability to the public."

Cross-coalition advocacy
In November 2012, the coalition joined 20 other organizations in calling on Congress to allow sequestration to occur, and in September 2012, called for letting the Wind Production Tax Credit Expire along with 63 other advocacy groups. In June 2013, the coalition signed on to a letter along with 11 other groups urging Congress not to allow appropriations to exceed sequester levels. In July 2013, the coalition joined 10 other groups in urging an open rule on the Defense Appropriations bill.

In January 2014, the coalition joined on 11 other groups in urging Congress to repeal a duplicative USDA Catfish Inspection Program within the Farm Bill Conference Legislation 

That month, the Coalition to Reduce Spending also joined a broad group of organizations urging Congress to “remember that spending on ineffective weapons systems and wasteful Pentagon programs does not make us safer but spending smarter can make us stronger.” 

In February, the coalition signed on to a bipartisan letter with 36 organizations that criticized Congress for using the Overseas Contingency Operations budget to skirt required spending cuts.

Media
CRS President Jonathan Bydlak was featured in an interview with ReasonTV's Nick Gillespie, which characterized Bydlak as "The Grover Norquist of Spending Cuts." Red Alert Politics also has profiled Bydlak, characterizing him as the possible "next Grover Norquist," in a personal profile focusing on the growth rise in prominence of the coalition. The Fiscal Times and Business Insider have made similar comparisons because of Bydlak's work with the Reject the Debt pledge.

Criticism
The majority of critiques unfavorable to the coalition have been directed toward the Reject the Debt pledge.

Scott Galupo at The American Conservative criticized signatories writing that a "statutorily required balanced budget is a stupid idea, and that anyone who signs this new pledge is terrifically insane and should therefore be disqualified from public office. Other than that, it’s a significant improvement on Norquist’s porous pledge."

Ramesh Ponnuru, senior editor at National Review, wrote "while I wish it could be done, I don’t think it’s possible to pledge our way to lower spending."

Funding
The organization is funded entirely through private donors and corporate contributors.

See also
 United States public debt
 Social programs in the United States
 Military budget of the United States

References

External links 
 

Political advocacy groups in the United States
Conservative organizations in the United States